Enrique Llanos (born 5 July 1980 in San Juan) is a Puerto Rican hurdler. He competed in the 110 m hurdles event at the 2012 Summer Olympics.

Competition record
Major Championship Events

References

External links
 

Sportspeople from San Juan, Puerto Rico
Puerto Rican male hurdlers
1980 births
Living people
Olympic track and field athletes of Puerto Rico
Athletes (track and field) at the 2012 Summer Olympics
Doping cases in athletics
Puerto Rican sportspeople in doping cases
Athletes (track and field) at the 2007 Pan American Games
Athletes (track and field) at the 2011 Pan American Games
Pan American Games competitors for Puerto Rico